Calvin Miller (born 5 September 1996) is an American middle-distance runner who specializes in the 800-meter discipline. He ran collegiately at The University of Oklahoma. He is currently the NCAA Men's Division I Indoor Track and Field Big XII Champion for the 1,000-meter run with a time of 2:30:44.

Early life 
Miller was born in Oklahoma City, Oklahoma where he ran track and cross country. He is the son of Rick and Debbie Miller and has a brother, Jack. In high school, Miller served as president of the student council, he was a three-time Masonic Award winner and a member of Senior Council and National Honor Society. At the end of his senior year, Miller also won the prestigious Mr. Westmoore Award.

Running career

High school 
Miller attended Westmoore High School. While at Westmoore he was the State Runner-up in the 4x800-meter and 800-meter his junior year. He would go on to win both events at State in his senior season. In 2013 he was awarded the OSSAA Academic All-State. He originally committed to Tulsa University but then said "nah" and switched to OU. Miller also ran cross-country in high school and was good at that too.

Collegiate 
Miller currently attends The University of Oklahoma and is on an athletic scholarship. He is a red-shirt Sophomore, majors in Chemistry. He also was a member of the President's Leadership Class at OU. While in college, Miller has competed in the 800 meter, 4x800-meter relay, 1,000-meter, and the mile run in indoor and outdoor track and field.

Awards

References

External links 
 http://www.soonersports.com/ViewArticle.dbml?ATCLID=210578909&DB_OEM_ID=31000
 http://www.soonersports.com/ViewArticle.dbml?DB_OEM_ID=31000&ATCLID=211695625
 http://www.normantranscript.com/sports/high_school_sports/community-service-helps-westmoore-s-calvin-miller-earn-jim-thorpe/article_625edc84-19b8-5916-8889-3ffaed704efb.html

1996 births
Living people
American male middle-distance runners
Oklahoma Sooners men's track and field athletes